Parking is a 2008 Taiwanese movie.

Synopsis

On Mother's Day in Taipei, Chen-Mo (Chang Chen) makes a dinner date with his wife (Gwei Lun-mei), hoping to improve their estranged relationship. While he is buying a cake on his way home, a car double-parks next to his, preventing his exit. For the entire night, Chen-Mo searches for the owner of the car and encounters a succession of strange events and eccentric characters: an old couple living with their precocious granddaughter who have lost their only son; a one-armed barbershop owner cooking fish-head soup; a mainland Chinese prostitute trying to escape her pimp’s cruel clutches; and a Hong-Kong tailor embroiled in debt and captured by underground loan sharks.

Cast

 Chang Chen as Chen Mo
 Gwei Lun-mei as Chen Mo's Wife
 Leon Dai as Pimp
 Chapman To as Tailor
 Jack Kao as Barber
 Peggy Tseng as Hooker
 Tou Chung-hua as Gang Leader
 Lai-Yin Yang
 Lin Kai-jung as Barber's Granddaughter
 Holger Chen as Gang Member

Festivals

 Cannes Film Festival 2008 – Un Certain Regard
 Montreal World Film Festival 2008
 Bangkok International Film Festival 2008
 Vancouver International Film Festival 2008
 Pusan International Film Festival 2008
 Hong Kong Asian Film Festival 2008
 Stockholm International Film Festival 2008
 Thessaloniki International Film Festival 2008
 Taipei Golden Horse Film Festival 2008 – Opening Film
 !f Istanbul International Independent Film Festival 2009
 Spokane International Film Festival 2009
 2009 Adelaide Film Festival
 Osaka Asian Film Festival 2009
 Bradford International Film Festival 2009
 Taiwan London Cinefest 2009
 Barcelona Asian Film Festival
 Silk Screen Film Festival 2009
 Wisconsin Film Festival 2011

Award

 Golden Horse Award, Best Art Direction – FIPRESCI Critics Award: Taipei Golden Horse Film Festival 2008
 Best New Talent - Audience Favourite Film: Hong Kong Asian Film Festival 2008

References

External links
 
 Canadian Distributor : Evokative Films
 Variety
 Time Out Hong-Kong
 BC Magazine
 Twitchfilm
 Screen Daily

2008 films
Taiwanese drama films
Films directed by Chung Mong-hong